NGC 7260 (NGC 7257) is an intermediate spiral galaxy located in the constellation Aquarius. It is a peculiar galaxy.

References

Intermediate spiral galaxies
Peculiar galaxies
Aquarius (constellation)
7260
68691